When the Smoke Clears: Sixty 6, Sixty 1 is the fourth studio album by American hip hop group Three 6 Mafia. The album was released on June 13, 2000, by Loud with Hypnotize Minds Records. The album was certified Platinum by the RIAA (Recording Industry Association of America) for selling 1,000,000 copies on December 1, 2000. The album bolstered the group's popularity immensely, and contains some of Three 6 Mafia's most well known tracks, such as "Sippin' on Some Syrup" “Who Run It” and "I’m So Hi". The album was one of the last projects featuring all of the original group's members, as Gangsta Boo left after the choices album, and Koopsta Knicca left after the album's release.

Track listing
All tracks are produced by DJ Paul and Juicy J

Charts

Weekly charts

Year-end charts

Certifications

References

2000 albums
Three 6 Mafia albums
Gangsta rap albums by American artists
Horrorcore albums
Southern hip hop albums
Hardcore hip hop albums
Loud Records albums
Albums produced by DJ Paul
Albums produced by Juicy J